Goof off may refer to:

 Goofing off, a slang term for engaging in recreation or an idle pastime while obligations of work or society are neglected
 Goof-off Goose, a character in the Sweet Pickles book series
 Goof-Off or Jester, a character class in Dragon Quest III

See also
 "Stop the World, I Want to Goof Off", a story from the Simpson's episode "Treehouse of Horror XIV"
 Goof (disambiguation)